Kichi (also Romanized as Kīchī; also known as Kechī and Kirichi) is a village in Jabal Rural District, Kuhpayeh District, Isfahan County, Isfahan Province, Iran. At the 2006 census, its population was 63, in 35 families.

References 

Populated places in Isfahan County